Bursari is a Local Government Area in Yobe State, Nigeria.

It has an area of 3,818 km and a population of 109,124 at the 2006 census.

The postal code of the area is 620.

The Bade language is spoken in Bursari LGA.

See also 
 List of Local Government Areas in Yobe State

References

Local Government Areas in Yobe State